RAIM or Raim may refer to:

 Raum, a demon
 Receiver autonomous integrity monitoring
 Redundant array of independent memory